The 1938 German Grand Prix was a championship Grand Prix held on 24 July 1938 at the Nürburgring in Nazi Germany. It was the 2nd race in the 1938 European Championship. The race which was 22 laps, was won by Richard Seaman driving a Mercedes-Benz W154 after starting from 3rd place.

Entries

Race 

Notes
  - After Walter Bäumer's car failed to start, he joined Hermann Lang in the #14 car.
  - Subsequently, after the #14 car suffered an engine failure, Hermann Lang joined Rudolf Caracciola in the #10 car.
  - After Tazio Nuvolari's lap 2 crash, he joined Hermann Müller in the #2 car.

References 

German Grand Prix
German Grand Prix
Grand Prix